International isolation is a penalty applied by the international community or a sizeable or powerful group of countries, like the United Nations, towards one nation, government or group of people. The same term may also refer to the state a country finds itself in after being shunned by the international community of nations or the greater group of countries. The determinants of the greater group of countries rely on economic, political and cultural stability but since the global order is constantly changing with the rise of developing countries such grouping may change.

Definitions
International isolation is often the result of international sanctions against a specific country (or group of countries), but it may also be a result of a policy of isolationism by the country in question. Libya under Muammar Gaddafi, for example, ended up in a state of international isolation after decades of confrontation with the West and its critical politics against fellow Arab governments.

Countries which have seceded from another state may find themselves under international isolation, like Abkhazia, which is only recognized by a handful of countries after breaking away from Georgia with the help of the Russian military. Northern Cyprus, the northern section of the island of Cyprus, finds itself in a similar situation. Usually such states and their interests are protected by a larger neighbour.

Certain widely acknowledged terms or concepts, like "pariah state", have been coined to refer to countries that have isolated themselves internationally or have been isolated by sizable groups of nations. The characteristics of such a state are "...precarious diplomatic isolation, the absence of assured, credible security support or political moorings within big-power alliance structures, and ... [being] the targets of obsessive and unrelenting opprobrium and censure within international forums such as the United Nations." One such State was the People's Republic of Kampuchea after 1979, when both the People's Republic of China and the United States pushed for its isolation in the international arena, after not having approved of the Vietnamese invasion to ouster the Khmer Rouge. Another example is when countries fail to comply with or drop out of international agreements. Canada's pull out of the Kyoto Protocol to limit greenhouse gases in 2011 is such an example.

The concept "falling off the map" was used by Trinidadian-British political writer V. S. Naipaul in reference to the growing international isolation of the Islamic Republic of Iran after being in the limelight during the times of Shah Rezā Pahlavi and during the first years of the Revolution.

History
International isolation contributed to the downfall of the Spanish Republican government following the Non-Intervention Agreement in the Spanish Civil War signed in August 1936 and supported by 24 nations. The Republic had to fight a war under virtually total international isolation and a de facto economic embargo that placed it at an insurmountable disadvantage against the rebel faction.
Lacking badly needed assistance from the democratic powers such as France, the United Kingdom, and the United States, the Spanish Republic was subject to a severe form of international isolation between 1936, shortly after the rebel coup, and the defeat of the loyalist forces in 1939. Maritime access for material from the Soviet Union—the only country, together with Mexico, which defied the Non-intervention Pact— aid was effectively cut off by the attacks of Italian submarines and the French frontier remained closed. Although imposed in the name of neutrality, the international isolation of the Spanish Republic ended up favouring the interests of the future Axis Powers.   

One of the most famous examples of international isolation was South Africa during the Apartheid years.
While poverty is usually one of the results of international isolation, the elite in the Republic of South Africa was able to maintain its status and wealth, the most economically disadvantaged classes bearing the brunt of the situation. Burma, an isolated state owing to its harsh military rule, has one of the world's poorest healthcare systems despite the abundance of natural resources in the country. 

Throughout the 2011 Libyan civil war, a number of powerful countries pushed for the international isolation of colonel Muammar Gaddafi's Libyan Jamahiriya. International pressure, along with assistance to rebel groups, eventually contributed to Gaddafi's downfall and death. Also, in the 2011-2012 Syrian uprising, several foreign countries imposed tough sanctions against the regime of President Bashar al-Assad.

With the increasing democratic backsliding and autocracy in Venezuela during the administration of Nicolás Maduro, the country faced growing international isolation.

See also
International sanctions
Trade embargo
Economic sanctions
Apartheid in South Africa
Rhodesia
Northern Cyprus
Pariah state
Rogue state
Sakoku
Regional inequality

References

External links
 The European Union’s sanctions related to Human rights: the case of Burma/Myanmar.
Abrams, Elliott, Security and sacrifice : isolation, intervention, and American foreign policy (1948) 

International relations
International sanctions